helpucover is a Hertfordshire-based insurance company that specialises in pet insurance and "gadget" and mobile phone insurance. It had previously offered mortgage protection insurance, income protection insurance, and appliance warranties.

History 
helpucover is a trading style of Pinnacle Insurance plc, one of the UK's protection insurers.

Established in 1971,  Pinnacle Insurance plc currently employ over 300 workers in the United Kingdom.

Its ultimate parent company is the French multinational BNP Paribas.

Publicity 
In the past, helpucover had been reported as an insurer for mortgage insurance and income protection insurance on Money Saving Expert  and Money Supermarket.

References

External links 
 helpucover company website

Financial services companies established in 1971
Insurance companies of the United Kingdom
1971 establishments in England